Silly Fellows  is a 2018 Telugu comedy film starring Allari Naresh, Sunil, Chitra Shukla, Nandini Rai, and Jaya Prakash Reddy in lead roles. It is directed by Bhimaneni Srinivasa Rao. Produced by Kiran Reddy, Bharath Chowdary, T. G. Vishwa Prasad and Vivek Kuchibhotla under the banner Blue Planet Entertainments LLP and People Media Factory. It the official remake of the 2016 Tamil comedy, Velainu Vandhutta Vellaikaaran.

Plot
Veerababu's tricks his friend Soori into marrying Pushpa while Veerababu falls in love with Vasanthi. As problems start to rise, Veerababu and Soori goes to MLA Jacket Janaki Ram, who in spite of all of the problems falls into a coma. How Janaki Ram recovers from the coma to file Soori's divorce and fix Veerababu's land issues forms the rest of the story.

Cast 
Allari Naresh as Veerababu
Sunil as Suribabu
Chitra Shukla as Vasanthi
Nandini Rai as Pushpa
Jaya Prakash Reddy as MLA Jacket Janakiram
Brahmanandam as Fake DGP
 Nandini Rai as Pushpa 
Posani Krishna Murali as Prasad
Poorna as Krishnaveni
Raja Ravindra as Lanka Bangaru Raju 
Chalapathi Rao
Raghu Karumanchi as Abhijit,  Prasad's sidekick
Jhansi as Vasanthi's Mom
Hema as Jacket Janakiram's wife
Sivannarayana Naripeddi as Doctor

Soundtrack 
Music in the film includes:
Silly Fellows — by Geetha Vasanth, Master Sri Charan, and Pranav Chaganty (2:28)
Headache Ra Mama Headache — by Penchal Das (3:59)
Pilla Nee Buggalu — by Rahul Sipligunj (3:12)

References

External links 
 

2018 films
Indian screwball comedy films
2010s screwball comedy films
2010s Telugu-language films
Telugu remakes of Tamil films
Films directed by Bhimaneni Srinivasa Rao
2018 comedy films